Western Alumni Stadium (formerly TD Stadium) is an 8,000-seat Canadian football stadium located on the campus of the University of Western Ontario in London, Ontario. It is home to the Western Mustangs football team and is one of the largest stadiums in the OUA provincial conference. It was built in 2000 at a cost of approximately $10.65 million by Norlon Builders London Ltd and designed by Stantec Consulting Ltd.

The stadium was built as a replacement for the former JW Little Stadium, which held its last game in 1999 before demolition. JW Little Stadium had been on Western's campus since 1929. The stadium was opened on September 16, 2000, when the first Western Mustangs home game was played.

During the request for sponsorship funding, the Canadian-owned bank TD Canada Trust gave $1.5 million towards the stadium construction. Originally named the TD Waterhouse Stadium, the name was changed in 2013 to reflect new branding for TD and then changed to its current name in 2021 after a donation of $1.4 million was given by the Alumni Association.

In addition to the Western Mustangs, the stadium is also home to the London Beefeaters, who are part of the Canadian Junior Football League.

In spring 2009, the newly formed FC London of the USL Premier Development League began playing their home games at this venue.

Facility 
The stadium has a regulation CFL Canadian football sized field (110 yards by 65 yards) made out of FieldTurf. Surrounding the field is an 8-lane, 400-metre Mondo rubber track. The seating has two separate grandstands with a total capacity for 8,000. During large games, the stadium can accommodate 10,000 additional standing spectators.

In addition to the track, the facility also as multiple long jump sand pits, javelin and a discus circle.

The main building is known as the JW Little building and houses the players changing rooms, the Michael Kirkley Training Centre, coaching offices, as well as a lounge and terrace.

Renovations 
In summer 2007, the AstroTurf was replaced by FieldTurf at a cost of approximately $1 million.

The stadium field and track underwent renovations in summer 2021 to replace the track surface and the artificial FieldTurf. Along with those playing surfaces, the stadium lights were upgraded to facilitate better visibility during night games. The budgeted cost for this project was $4.6 million.

Notable events 
The stadium hosts a number of events outside of the university. Every year, local London public schools through the Thames Valley School Board use the facilities often to host track and field events. The stadium also hosts local London high school football games known as Red Feather games, in which local senior high school football teams play their first game of the season.

The stadium was used as the main venue for the 2001 Canada Summer Games.

In 2002, the stadium was used for an exhibition CFL game between the Toronto Argonauts and Hamilton Tiger-Cats which was a sellout at 9,178 fans.

The stadium was the host of the 2004 Men's Pan American Cup for the men's international field hockey championship.

In 2006, the stadium hosted the 2006 World Lacrosse Championship and the game attendance was 7,735.

London hosted the 2010 Canadian Special Olympics and the stadium became one of a number of venues across the city.

In the summer of 2018, the stadium was the main venue for the 2018 Ontario Summer Games. The stadium is again the main venue for the 2021 Ontario Summer Games, being held in London for the second time in a row.

References

External links
Official website

Athletics (track and field) venues in Ontario
Canadian football venues in Ontario
University of Western Ontario
Soccer venues in Ontario
Sports venues in London, Ontario
University sports venues in Canada
2000 establishments in Ontario
Sports venues completed in 2000